1977 Academy Awards may refer to:

 49th Academy Awards, the Academy Awards ceremony that took place in 1977
 50th Academy Awards, the 1978 ceremony honoring the best in film for 1977